Somatic recombination, as opposed to the genetic recombination that occurs in meiosis, is an alteration of the DNA of a somatic cell that is inherited by its daughter cells. The term is usually reserved for large-scale alterations of DNA such as chromosomal translocations and deletions and not applied to point mutations. Somatic recombination occurs physiologically in the assembly of the B cell receptor and T-cell receptor genes (V(D)J recombination), as well as in the class switching of immunoglobulins. Somatic recombination is also important in the process of carcinogenesis.

In neurons of the human brain, somatic recombination occurs in the gene that encodes the amyloid precursor protein APP.  Neurons from individuals with sporadic Alzheimer's disease show greater APP gene diversity due to somatic recombination than neurons from healthy individuals.

References 

Molecular biology